The Bankers' Toadies incident occurred in 1937 in Alberta, Canada when a pamphlet advocating the "extermination" of nine men identified as "Bankers' Toadies" was distributed to Alberta MLAs. The men were opponents of the Social Credit government of Premier William Aberhart, which had been elected on a promise of giving Albertans monthly dividends; Aberhart blamed the banking system for his failure to follow through on this pledge.

After David Duggan, leader of the Conservative Party and one of the men named, raised his concern over the pamphlet in the Legislative Assembly of Alberta, police raided the Social Credit League's Edmonton headquarters. Social Credit whip and MLA Joe Unwin and Social Credit Board advisor George Frederick Powell were arrested and charged with criminal libel and counselling to murder. Both were convicted of the libel charge, and Justice William Carlos Ives sentenced them to hard labour.

Background

William Aberhart's Social Credit League won a substantial victory in the 1935 Alberta provincial election on the strength of its promise to implement social credit, an economic theory proposed by British engineer C. H. Douglas.  Social credit held that the poverty of the Great Depression was in part the fault of bankers, who kept the cost of credit, and by extension of production, high.  Aberhart's solution involved, among other things, monthly "credit dividends" to Albertans in the amount of Can$25.

By 1937, Aberhart's failure to implement these dividends or make other progress towards implementing social credit made many of his backbenchers suspect that he was either unwilling or unable to do so. This belief, combined with a suspicion that he did not properly understand Douglas's theories, led to the 1937 Social Credit backbenchers' revolt.  One outcome of the revolt was Aberhart's ceding a number of the government's powers to the Social Credit Board, made up of five Social Credit backbenchers.  Glenville MacLachlan, its chair, travelled to the United Kingdom, where he asked Douglas to come to Alberta and serve as its advisor. Douglas declined, but in his stead sent two of his lieutenants, L. D. Byrne and George Frederick Powell.  Part of the Board's mandate was to educate the public about social credit; to this end, Powell and Social Credit whip Joseph Unwin were assigned to write educational materials.

In response to what they saw as the radically anti-business views of the Aberhart government and the Social Credit Board, Alberta's mainstream opposition parties—chiefly the Liberals and the Conservatives—began to cooperate under the auspices of the newly formed People's League.

Leaflet

In October 1937, Conservative leader David Duggan rose in the Legislative Assembly of Alberta to draw its attention to a pamphlet distributed in and around the legislature building that called for his "extermination".  The front of the leaflet read as follows:
My child, you should NEVER say hard or unkind things about Bankers' Toadies. God made snakes, slugs, snails and other creepy-crawly, treacherous, and poisonous things. NEVER, therefore, abuse them—just exterminate them!  And to prevent all evasion demand the RESULT you want—$25.00 a month and a lower cost to live.
The back of the pamphlet listed nine men identified as "toadies". Besides Duggan, they were
S. W. Field, lawyer and president of the People's League
H. H. Parlee, lawyer and president of the Liberals' Edmonton constituency association
John Lymburn, lawyer, member of the People's League, and former Attorney-General of Alberta
H. R. Milner, lawyer and president of the Conservatives' Edmonton constituency association
G. D. Hunt, investment broker
L. Y. Cairns, lawyer, member of the Conservatives' provincial executive
G. W. Auxier, lawyer and secretary of the People's League
William Antrobus Griesbach, lawyer, member of the Senate of Canada, and former member of the House of Commons of Canada and mayor of Edmonton
Below this list of names were the words "Exterminate Them. And to prevent all Evasion, Demand the Result You Want—$25.00 a MONTH and a lower cost to live."

On October 3, the police raided the Social Credit League's Edmonton office and seized 4,000 copies of the pamphlet.  Griesbach pressed charges against Powell and Unwin for criminal libel and counselling to murder.

Trial

Aberhart, who besides being Premier was Attorney-General, tried to prevent the trial from proceeding by withdrawing the Crown prosecutor assigned to it. Either trial judge William Carlos Ives or a justice of the peace countered by appointing a private prosecutor so the case could go ahead. Both defendants were held on $20,000 bail.  Both hired lawyers: Powell was represented by Hugh Calais Macdonald, while Unwin retained one R. Jackson.  George Steer acted for the prosecution.

On October 27, both men appeared before police magistrate A. H. Gibson for their preliminary hearings on the criminal libel charge (the counselling to murder charge had been dropped). Unwin opted for a jury trial, while Powell elected to be tried by a judge alone. Unwin's trial proceeded first, on November 12. He testified that he had ordered the pamphlets, which were paid for by the government, and then circulated them as a publication of the "United Democrats", a fictitious organization that listed its address as that of Unwin's home. According to Unwin, the leaflet's text, minus the named individuals, had been provided to him by Powell, he had sent it to the printer's in exactly that form, and he was surprised to see the list of names in the final version.  Though his testimony was vague and apparently evasive, he admitted to destroying 4,000 copies of the leaflet on the day of the police raid.  He was convicted and Ives, dismissing his role in the affair as that of an "errand boy", sentenced him to three months hard labour.

Powell's trial proceeded immediately after Unwin's, and his testimony contradicted much of what Unwin had said. Powell claimed that Unwin had put the list of names on the pamphlet, and that Powell had expected that it would list organizations rather than individuals.  Ives found Unwin's testimony more credible, convicted Powell on November 15, and sentenced him to six months hard labour. He also recommended that he be deported to his native United Kingdom following his sentence.  Appeals by both men against conviction and sentence were unsuccessful.

Aftermath

The case attracted considerable media attention and mixed reactions.  A Toronto spokesman for the Communist Party of Canada protested the arrests and called for a "united front" against the People's League.  Aberhart maintained that the men had been jailed on the basis of some harmless political humour, and encouraged the federal government to grant them clemency; Prime Minister of Canada William Lyon Mackenzie King responded that to do so would be to engage in "direct interference by the federal executive with the free and proper functioning of our courts".  Every night, some Social Crediters drove to the Fort Saskatchewan Penitentiary, where the men were being held, to show their support.  On February 11, 1938, the legislature passed a resolution calling for the men's release.

Douglas reacted to his deputy's arrest with anger, telling reporters that "whoever is instigating the proceedings is asking for a great deal of trouble, and is likely to get it."  On December 10, 1937, he wrote King to tell him that he had been invited to come to Alberta to provide advice, and asked if he would be risking arrest and deportation if he did so. King responded that as long as Douglas, unlike Powell, refrained from running afoul of the Criminal Code, he had nothing to fear.

At the end of Unwin's sentence, Social Credit MLAs celebrated with a snake dance on the floor of the Legislature.

Powell was released after four months' imprisonment, on March 21, 1938, in an attempt by King to bolster his Liberals' chances in a federal by-election in Edmonton East the same day; the by-election was won by Social Crediter Orvis A. Kennedy, and a jubilant celebration followed. Once again, the Communists expressed solidarity with the Social Crediters, with Jan Lakeman thanking the voters for giving "an overwhelming defeat to the forces of reaction".  Powell left Canada immediately upon his release, but not before being paid $4,000 by the Alberta government as thanks for his services.

On August 18, 1938, police magistrate A. H. Gibson, who had presided over the prosecution of Unwin and Powell, was dismissed without cause by provincial Order in Council. Gibson believed that his dismissal was due to "the government's resentment over my action in the Powell-Unwin case and the fact that they hold me more or less to blame for the fact that the accused men were sent to jail."

Aberhart's Social Crediters were re-elected with a reduced majority in the 1940 provincial election; Aberhart remained premier until his death in 1943. Unwin however was defeated in 1940 by Labour candidate Angus James Morrison. Though he lived until January 4, 1987, Unwin remains most remembered for his involvement in the Bankers' Toadies incident.

Notes

References

External links
Radio drama based on the incident (audio file)
Joseph Unwin's account of the incident (audio file)

1937 in Canada
1937 in case law
1937 in politics
History of Alberta
Politics of Alberta